Sons of Thunder is an American action crime drama television series created by Aaron and Chuck Norris that aired from March 6 to April 17, 1999 on CBS. It was a spin-off of Walker, Texas Ranger.

Series overview

Pilot
The two-hour pilot, Sons of Thunder, was shown as episode 4.24 of Walker. This episode introduced the characters of childhood friends Carlos Sandoval, a Dallas PD Detective, and Trent Malloy, an Army sergeant and a protégé of Walker.

When Rev. Thunder Malloy, a close friend of Walker, dies from a heart attack, his son Trent returns home and, eventually, quits the Army to stay. Walker and his partner Trivette go after a serial cop killer who has Carlos on his list, which Trent ends up getting involved in by accident when he saved Carlos' life and later helped Walker and Carlos take down the criminal.

Seasons 5 and 6 of Walker
During Seasons 5 and 6 of Walker, Carlos appeared on 15 episodes and Trent for 12 episodes (one of these episodes included a Hayes Cooper story in which both actors appeared in a dual role). During these episodes, Trent opens his own martial arts dojo as well as a protection agency to either help people who are too scared to go to the police or who the police can't help. Sometimes he has Carlos assist him in some of his cases and at other times they help Walker on several of his cases, which often involve personal issues, or Trent turns over his current case

The spin-off series
Finally, in 1999, they got their own spin-off series, which only lasted six episodes. Carlos resigns from the PD after his partner is murdered by a serial killer, who was a failed police applicant. He teams up with Trent to find the assassin and they later decide to form their own private investigation firm called Thunder Investigation.

Cast

Main
 James Wlcek as Trent Malloy
 Marco Sanchez as Detective Carlos Sandoval
 Dawn Maxey as Kim Sutter
 Alan Autry as Butch McMann
 Shane Meier as Tommy Malloy

Recurring
 Chuck Norris as Ranger Cordell Walker
 Clarence Gilyard as Ranger James Trivette

Cancellation
Sons of Thunder aired in the same timeslot as "Walker, Texas Ranger" (Saturdays at 10pm ET). Producers Chuck and Aaron Norris assumed that the show would be renewed but CBS passed, citing budget concerns.

Episodes

References

External links
 
 

1999 American television series debuts
1999 American television series endings
American television spin-offs
CBS original programming
Fictional portrayals of the Dallas Police Department
Martial arts television series
Television shows set in Dallas
Television series by CBS Studios
Television series by Sony Pictures Television
1990s Western (genre) television series